Rock Point Provincial Park is a park located on the north shore of Lake Erie near the mouth of the Grand River in the Carolinian zone of southwestern Ontario.

Habitats within the park include wetlands, forests and dunes. Trees include the uncommon Big Shellbark Hickory. Limestone shelves along the lake shore contain the fossils of marine animals from the Devonian period. There is also a sandy beach for swimming.

Located above the fossil beds is a red clay bluff which separates the campgrounds from the Lake.

There is a bird banding station in the park for monitoring bird migration.

The fossil beds also contain deposits of chert, a stone similar to flint which was worked to produce stone points.  An archeological survey of the park revealed a late paleo-Indian camp.  The camp showed evidence that the people were working the chert as well as fishing in the lake.

External links

Provincial parks of Ontario
Parks in Haldimand County
Temperate broadleaf and mixed forests in Canada
Forests of Ontario
Protected areas established in 1990
1990 establishments in Ontario